The tenth series of the children's television series Hi-5 aired between 7 July 2008 and 5 September 2008 on the Nine Network in Australia. The series was produced by Kids Like Us for Nine with Helena Harris as executive producer. 

This was the last series to be produced by Kids Like Us, and the last involving creator Helena Harris. It was also the first series to feature Stevie Nicholson, and the last to feature Sun Park and original cast members Kellie Crawford, Nathan Foley and Charli Robinson. The series featured the 400th episode.

Production
Prior to production of the tenth series of Hi-5 in 2007, cast member Tim Harding was involved in a serious motorcycle accident which left him unable to keep up with the demands of the Hi-5 live performances. Just a few days prior to this, Stevie Nicholson was hired as an understudy for the group's touring schedule, and immediately began work as a temporary replacement for Harding after the accident. In November 2007, Harding announced his permanent departure from the group after recovering from injuries. Nicholson took his place as a permanent member and joined the group for the filming of the tenth series. Creator Helena Harris stated "it's like [he] was born to this job."

The tenth series premiered on 7 July 2008, with the episodes exploring contemporary themes such as different family structures, and technology. Unlike former cast member Kathleen de Leon Jones, Harding's departure was not explained on-screen. This was the final series produced by Kids Like Us and last to involve creator Helena Harris, before the program's sale to the Nine Network and Southern Star in 2008. As the transition was complete at the time of airing, the episodes were announced under the new management.

Sun Park returned for her second series, along with original cast members Kellie Crawford, Nathan Foley, and Charli Robinson. By the time of airing, Robinson had already departed from the cast, with intentions of furthering her presenting career. Crawford, Foley and Park also departed at the end of 2008, making the tenth series the last to feature any original members of the group.

Cast

Presenters
 Kellie Crawford – Word Play
 Nathan Foley – Shapes in Space
 Stevie Nicholson – Making Music
 Sun Park – Puzzles and Patterns
 Charli Robinson  – Body Move

Episodes

Home video releases

References

External links
 Hi-5 Website

2008 Australian television seasons